The list of ship launches in 2008 includes a chronological list of ships launched in 2008.


References

See also 

2008
Ship launches